Abdel-Hadi Mohammad Al-Maharmeh is a Jordanian footballer who plays as a striker for Balama.

Honors and Participation in International Tournaments

In AFC Asian Cups 
2004 Asian Cup

In WAFF Championships 
2004 WAFF Championship
2007 WAFF Championship
2008 WAFF Championship

International goals

References
 Al-Maharmeh Officially Signs Up for Shabab Al-Ordon

External links 
 
 
 

1981 births
Living people
Jordanian footballers
Jordan international footballers
2004 AFC Asian Cup players
Association football forwards
Sahab SC players
Shabab Al-Ordon Club players
Al-Jazeera (Jordan) players
Al-Asalah players
Al-Salt SC players
Al-Faisaly SC players
Balama SC players
Al-Tai FC players
Saham SC players
Jordanian Pro League players
Oman Professional League players
Saudi First Division League players
Jordanian expatriate footballers
Jordanian expatriate sportspeople in Saudi Arabia
Jordanian expatriate sportspeople in Oman
Expatriate footballers in Saudi Arabia
Expatriate footballers in Oman